Khanom khai pla (literally: "fish-roe snack") is a type of Thai dessert. It can be considered as a rare and little known dessert.

Khanom khai pla is made from the ripe toddy palm fruit (similar to khanom tan), rice flour and white sugar, it is then formed into what resembles fish roe and then boiled in water or clean syrup. Once cooked it floats to the surface, where it is removed and sprinkled with shredded coconut. It also has a taro flavour.

Presently, as far as is known, it is only cooked and sold in two places viz Ko Kret in Nonthaburi and 100 Years Sam Chuk Old Market in Sam Chuk, Suphan Buri.

See also
 List of Thai desserts and snacks

References

Thai desserts and snacks